, also known as Kazuo Umezz's Horror Theater, is a Japanese six-part anthology horror film series based on manga works by Kazuo Umezu. It was released in 2005 to coincide with the 50th anniversary of the start of Umezu's career as a manga artist. The series was distributed by Shochiku, and features music composed by singer-songwriter Rurutia.

Films

House of Bugs
 is directed by Kiyoshi Kurosawa. Its plot centers around a husband and wife, the former of whom suspects the latter of not only being unfaithful to him, but possibly mutating into a large insect.

Ambrosia
, is directed by Itō Tadafumi and written by Hiroshi Takahashi. It follows a schoolgirl who goes on an extreme diet in order to win the affections of a boy.

Snake Girl
, directed by Noboru Iguchi, is an adaptation of The Spotted Girl, an installment in Umezu's 1965–66 manga trilogy Reptilia. The film stars Arisa Nakamura as Yumiko, a girl who is invited by her cousin to spend her summer vacation in a rural village, where she finds herself terrorized by a half-human, half-snake witch.

The Wish
 is directed by Atsushi Shimizu. It follows a lonely schoolboy who carves a companion for himself in the form of a wooden doll shaped like a human head.

Present
, directed by Yūdai Yamaguchi, sees a group of students' Christmas festivities interrupted by a murderous Santa Claus and his band of flesh-eating reindeer.

Death Make
 is directed by Taichi Itō. It follows a group of supposed psychics who, as part of a reality television program, are challenged to spend 24 hours in an abandoned office building where, ten years prior, a group of girls disappeared after attempting to summon ghosts.

Release
The six films were screened at the Eurospace theater in Shibuya, Tokyo, Japan, on 18 June 2005.

References

Bibliography

External links
 
 
 
 
 
 

Film series introduced in 2005
Horror film series
Japanese horror films
Japanese film series
Live-action films based on manga
Japanese splatter films